The Downtown Hotel is an establishment at Second Avenue and Queen Street in Dawson City, Yukon, Canada. It contains 59 rooms.

Sourtoe cocktail

The hotel has gained notoriety for its Sourtoe cocktail. The Sourtoe cocktail began during prohibition with a case of frostbite. In the 1920s, two outlaw brothers, Louie and Otto, were caught in a blizzard. Louie soaked his foot, and when the brothers got back to their cabin, Louie's foot was frostbitten with his right toe becoming gangrenous. Otto amputated it, and placed it in a jar filled with bourbon to commemorate the event. The drink was invented by Dick Stevenson ( 1930 - 21 November 2019).

To gain admittance to a club of drinkers of the Sourtoe cocktail, members must drink the cocktail and the lips of the participant must touch the toe. Over 100,000 customers have tried the concoction, although one intentionally swallowed the toe in 2013. Bartender Terry Lee says they would like to have another toe donated, because several toes have been damaged, stolen, swallowed or lost over the span of decades.

References

Buildings and structures in Dawson City
Hotels in Yukon